Noah Preminger (born ) is an American jazz saxophonist.

Music career
Born in 1986, Preminger grew up in Canton, Connecticut. While in high school, he studied with saxophonist Dave Liebman. He  released his debut album, Dry Bridge Road,  after graduating from the New England Conservatory of Music. The album was a sextet session with Ben Monder, pianist Frank Kimbrough, trumpeter Russ Johnson, bassist John Hébert, and drummer Ted Poor.

Preminger's second album as a leader, Before the Rain, came in 2011 from Palmetto, featuring a quartet with Kimbrough, Hébert and drummer Matt Wilson.

Preminger has played with Billy Hart, Dave Holland, Fred Hersch, Dave Douglas, Victor Lewis, John and Bucky Pizzarelli, Billy Drummond, George Cables, Roscoe Mitchell, and Eddie Henderson.

Critical reception
Of Brooklyn-based saxophonist Noah Preminger, the Hartford Courant said: "Playing with the grace and expressiveness of a jazz veteran, the young man with a horn mixes cool restraint with emotional depth and old-fashioned poetry with contemporary bite."

Jazz Review said: "Preminger seems to have arrived on the scene fully formed, with incisive musical instincts, a distinctive personal sound and an ability to write great tunes." The New York Times added: "More than just a promising starting point, this is a display of integrity; here's a musician you feel you can trust." Dry Bridge Road was named Debut of the Year in the Village Voice critics poll, making top 10 lists in JazzTimes, Stereophile and The Nation.

All About Jazz said about Before the Rain: "Sensitivity and an ear for aural sophistication are the hallmarks of tenor saxophonist Noah Preminger." Down Beat magazine said, "The creativity and passion remain extremely high," while The New York Times concluded: "Mr. Preminger designs a different kind of sound for each note, an individual destiny and story."

While he was a  student, the Boston Phoenix said: "Preminger's sound is beholden to no one. That makes him continually unpredictable and continually satisfying."

Discography

As a leader

As a sideman

References

 
 Noah Preminger official site
 "Blindfold Test: Noah Preminger", Downbeat, November 2020
 "Noah Preminger Quintet at Smalls NYC", London Jazz News, February 2020
 "Noah Preminger in Perpetual Motion", Downbeat, April 2019
 The Playlist: Offset Repents, and 13 More New Songs, Noah Preminger Quartet, The New York Times, 2-22-2019
 The Blues? Overcoming Hard Times Through Swinging Elegance, Noah Preminger, The New York Times, 5-20-2016
 Noah Preminger at the Jazz Standard, Noah Preminger, The New York Times, 5-22-2013
 "Before The Rain", NPR Jazz: The Best Jazz of 2011, National Public Radio
 Performance/Tour Review, Noah Preminger, All About Jazz, 10-20-2011
 "Before The Rain", Editor's Picks, Downbeat, January 2011
 Music Review, Noah Preminger, The New York Times, 12-02-2009

1986 births
Living people
American jazz saxophonists
American male saxophonists
People from Canton, Connecticut
Palmetto Records artists
21st-century American saxophonists
Jazz musicians from Connecticut
21st-century American male musicians
American male jazz musicians
Criss Cross Jazz artists